San Vicente del Raspeig (Spanish) or Sant Vicent del Raspeig (Valencian), or simply San Vicente / Sant Vicent, is a municipality located in the comarca of Alacantí, in the province of Alicante, Spain, inside the conurbation of Alicante city (6 km away and connected by bus routes and Alicante Tram).

It has an area of 40.5 km² and according to the 2007 census, a total population of 55.434 inhabitants, with a large student population because it contains part of the University of Alicante (Universitat d'Alacant), a major educational institution.

The town was founded in 1836 with the motto sequet però sanet ("dry but healthy"), but it was not considered a municipality until 1848.

There are two important festivals every year: the Bonfires called Fogueres de Sant Vicent in July, and the festival of  Moors and Christians in late April.

The city has many quarries of limestone that enable the existence of cement factories.

Notable people 
 Juanma Acevedo, footballer

Twin towns
San Vicente del Raspeig is twinned with:

  L'Isle-d'Abeau, France

Notes

References

External links
 Council Website
 Bonfire Festival
 Radio San Vicente
 Local Newspaper
 Football Team of San Vicente
 Sitio web de información turística de San Vicente del Raspeig

Municipalities in the Province of Alicante